Big Brother is a 2015 Bangladeshi action romance film directed by Shafi Uddin Shafi and produced by Shamsul Alam   It stars Mahiya Mahi in lead role, Shipan Mitra, Ahmed Sharif, Danny Sidak and many more. It released on 6 February 2015 throughout Bangladesh.

Plot
Mahi, who is a rough woman gangster, used to expose herself as a "Man", is called "Big Brother" by the gang members. Everything get changed when a happy-go-lucky guy named Rana comes to her life. Will Mahi find her pure love from Rana or it's a deep trick ?

Cast
 Mahiya Mahi as Big Brother
 Shipan Mita as Rana
 Ahmed Sharif as Mr. Gulzar
 Danny Sidak as DJ Eli
 Prabir Mitra
 Rebeka Rouf
 Bipasha Kabir
Ratan Khan

Production
Big Brother is produced by Shamsul Alam and distributed by Fatman Films. The production of the film was announced on 21 April 2014 and filming started on May. After shooting and dubbing the film was submitted to Censor Board on 6 January 2015. It was released on 6 February 2015 in 78 screens in Bangladesh.

Music 
The film includes a total of five songs written by Kabir Bokul and Gazi Mazharul Anwar and features Dinat Jahan, Kona, Sharmin Roma, Dola and others as playback singers. The songs are composed by Shouquat Ali Imon and Adit.

References

External links
Big Brother at the Bangla Movie Database

2015 films
Bengali-language Bangladeshi films
Bangladeshi action films
Films set in Bangladesh
Films scored by Shawkat Ali Emon
Films scored by Adit Ozbert
2010s Bengali-language films
2010s romantic thriller films
Bangladeshi films about revenge